The discography of British rock band Esben and the Witch consists of two released albums, one upcoming album, three extended plays, four singles, two promotional singles and 8 music videos. In 2009 they self-released their debut EP 33, then released their debut single "Lucia, at the Precipice" on Too Pure in February 2010. They then signed to Matador Records and released their debut single for the label "Marching Song" in October 2010. This was followed by the "Warpath" single the same month, then their debut album Violet Cries in January 2011. They released the final single from the album, "Chorea", in April 2011. In October 2012 they released the promotional single for "Deathwaltz", followed by their second album Wash the Sins Not Only the Face in January 2013. They have since left Matador and plan to create their own label. They are going to work with Steve Albini on their third album in summer 2014, and plan to release it by Autumn 2014. They are on PledgeMusic, which is an online Direct-to-Fan music platform that facilitates musicians reaching out to their fanbase (termed Pledgers) to pre-sell, market, and distribute music projects including recordings, music videos, and concerts. On PledgeMusic they are putting pre-orders for their third album up, in which some include a hand-made bonus EP called And New Life Blossoms From the Ruins, and the money will go towards the recording costs. On 7 April 2014 they will release a split EP with Thought Forms, featuring two new songs "No Dog" and "Butoh".

Studio albums

Extended plays

Live albums

Singles

Promotional singles

References 

Discographies of British artists
Esben and the Witch albums